Anasimyia grisescens , (Hull, 1943), the  Long-spurred Swamp Fly , is a rare species of syrphid fly observed on the Atlantic coast of the United States. Syrphid flies are also known as Hover Flies or Flower Flies because the adults are frequently found hovering around flowers from which they feed on nectar and pollen. The larvae are unknown.

References

Eristalinae
Articles created by Qbugbot
Insects described in 1943
Taxa named by Frank Montgomery Hull
Hoverflies of North America